Nami Miyazaki (born April 13, 1976) is a field hockey international goalkeeper from Japan, who was a member of the national women's team that competed at the 2004 Summer Olympics in Athens, Greece.

References
sports-reference

External links
 

Japanese female field hockey players
Female field hockey goalkeepers
Olympic field hockey players of Japan
Field hockey players at the 2004 Summer Olympics
1976 births
Living people
Asian Games medalists in field hockey
Field hockey players at the 2002 Asian Games
Asian Games bronze medalists for Japan
Medalists at the 2002 Asian Games
21st-century Japanese women